Chris Chase (born Irene Greengard; January 12, 1924 – October 31, 2013), also known by the stage name Irene Kane, was an American model, film actress, writer, and journalist. Her best-known role was in Killer's Kiss. She later wrote advice books and co-authored several celebrity autobiographies. She is the sister of Nobel Prize-winning neuroscientist Paul Greengard.

Early life and career
Born to Pearl (née Meister) and Benjamin Greengard in New York City in 1924, Irene Greengard was a model for Vogue. In the mid-fifties photographer Bert Stern, who had photographed her for that magazine, introduced her to film director Kubrick when he was looking for the female lead for Killer's Kiss. She took the professional name Irene Kane, and went on to appear in other films as well as Broadway theatre productions.

As Chris Chase, she moved into journalism, working at The New York Times, and writing advice books on weight loss and getting into film acting.

After a short stint at CBS Morning News, Chase joined CNN in 1980 and stayed until 1986, serving as the first anchor of Media Watch in 1985. She co-authored several celebrity autobiographies, including books by Rosalind Russell, Betty Ford, and Alan King, and co-authored a biography of Josephine Baker with Baker's adopted son Jean-Claude.

Marriage
On June 3, 1961, Kane married Michael Chase (born 1932), an educational television producer, and the son of playwright Mary Chase. She took her husband's surname professionally as well as legally. Chase and her husband were seriously injured in a car accident near Poughkeepsie, New York, in March 1975.

Death
Chase died of pancreatic cancer on October 31, 2013, at her home in New York City, aged 89.

Acting

Films and television
Killer's Kiss (1955)
Naked City (1958, 1963)
Love of Life (1962–65)
All That Jazz (1979; as Chris Chase)
Stanley Kubrick: A Life in Pictures (2001; as Chris Chase)

Stage
Threepenny Opera (1955)
The Ponder Heart (1956)
Tenderloin (1960)

Books

How to Be a Movie Star, or A Terrible Beauty Is Born (1974), 
Life Is a Banquet (1977) with Rosalind Russell, 
Times of My Life (1978) with Betty Ford, 
The Great American Waistline (1981), 
Betty: A Glad Awakening (1987) with Betty Ford, 
Josephine: The Josephine Baker Story (1993) with Jean-Claude Baker, 
Name Dropping (1996) with Alan King,

References

External links

1924 births
2013 deaths
Actresses from New York City
American film actresses
American stage actresses
American television journalists
Deaths from cancer in New York (state)
CNN people
Deaths from pancreatic cancer
Jewish American actresses
Writers from Queens, New York
Journalists from New York City
American women television journalists
21st-century American Jews
21st-century American women